Television veteran Jeff Wachtel launched Future Shack Entertainment, a television production company, in 2022. The company focuses on developing and co-financing shows for global audiences, taking advantage of a growing space in the market for non-affiliated production companies to service streamers and traditional linear networks.

Wachtel was the President of NBCUniversal International Studios, where he oversees a portfolio of content and production companies spanning the U.S., Canada, the U.K. and Australia.  Wachtel entered the role in 2018 and manages the London-based studio, whose producers include Carnival Films ("Downton Abbey"), Working Title Television, Heyday Television, Matchbox Pictures and an unscripted production company, Monkey ("Made In Chelsea").

Prior to his move to London, Wachtel served as the Chief Content Officer for NBCU Cable Entertainment overseeing all content for NBC cable networks USA, Syfy, Bravo, Oxygen, and E!, as well as serving as President of its cable studio Universal Content Productions.  Wachtel joined USA in 2001 as Executive Vice President, Original Programming.  At USA, Wachtel established the USA brand and led the network's transformation into the No. 1 cable net on the strength of its original programming. Among the many recent series produced by UCP under him are Mr. Robot, Suits and The Sinner for USA, Girlfriends’ Guide to Divorce for Bravo, The Magicians and 12 Monkeys for Syfy, and Difficult People for Hulu. Additional series launched under Wachtel's supervision include Burn Notice, Covert Affairs, In Plain Sight, Monk, Royal Pains, Psych, White Collar, The Dead Zone and The 4400.

Before USA, Wachtel served as President of Alliance Atlantis Television, supervising all series and longform programming for the Canadian program supplier. In 1997, he was the Executive Producer of the first-run syndicated series "Pensacola: Wings of Gold." Wachtel co-created the show while President of 3 Arts Television, a production company that partnered CBS, Sony and 3 Arts Management.
 
From 1990 to 1996, Wachtel was at Columbia Pictures Television, where he rose to Executive Vice President of Primetime Television, developing and launching successful series including Party of Five and Dawson's Creek.  Before arriving at Columbia Pictures Television, Wachtel was Senior Vice President, Development at Orion Television and Vice President, Development, at Robert Cooper Productions.
 
Wachtel began his career as a theatre director and producer.  He produced the first New York productions of David Mamet's works -- Sexual Perversity in Chicago and The Duck Variations.
 
A graduate of Yale University, Wachtel is a founding member of L.A. Works, a community-based volunteer organization, as well as board member of the Zimmer Children's Museum and the HRTS.

He currently resides in London with his wife, Sheryl.  They have two children, Emily and Jesse.

References 
Los Angeles Times 2011
NBC Universal
 https://deadline.com/2017/11/jeff-wachtel-president-of-nbcuniversal-international-studios-1202215694/
 https://www.c21media.net/wachtel-to-replace-edelstein-at-nbcuis/

External links 
 

Year of birth missing (living people)
Living people
Businesspeople from Los Angeles
Yale University alumni